M/S Floria was a ferry ordered by Siljarederiet Ab in 1968 and constructed in Oy Wärtsilä Ab between 1968 and 1970. It was set to sail between Turku and Stockholm. In 1975 it was sold to Compañia Trasmediterranea S.A.

The ship was scrapped in India in 2008.

References

External links 
 

Cruiseferries
Ferries of Finland